In-hye is a Korean feminine given name. Its meaning depends on the hanja used to write each syllable of the name. There are 29 hanja with the reading "in" and 16 hanja with the reading "hye" on the South Korean government's official list of hanja which may be registered for use in given names.

People
Queen Dowager Inhye (1445–1499), second wife of King Yejong of Joseon
Lee In-hye (born 1981), South Korean actress
Oh In-hye (1984–2020), South Korean actress

Fictional characters
Lee In-hye, played by Han Yeo-woon in 2005 South Korean television series My Lovely Sam Soon
In-hye, the sister of the main character in 2007 South Korean novel The Vegetarian
Park In-hye, played by Kim Ga-yeon in 2008 South Korean television series Working Mom
Yoo In-hye, played by Kim Hee-ae in 2011 South Korean television series Midas
Seo In-hye, played by Park Ha-sun in 2013 South Korean television series Two Weeks
Jo In-hye, played by Jo Kyung-sook in 2020 South Korean television series Soul Mechanic

See also
List of Korean given names

References

Korean feminine given names